Sorcerer's Apprentice is a video game for the Atari 2600, based on a sequence from the film Fantasia.

Gameplay
The player plays as Mickey Mouse in two different screens of play. One screen has various objects falling from the sky and he has the ability to shoot something up at them and catch certain things. The second screen involves him rushing up and down stairs trying to intercept an army of walking brooms to stop them from getting to the bottom and causing the room to flood more.

Reception
Randi Hacker for Electronic Fun with Computers & Games said: "Our only hypothesis is that it instills a healthy fear of brooms and cleaning paraphernalia which means that, when the kids who play this game grow up more people will need to be employed as maids".

Atari Age said that Sorcerer's Apprentice is a wonderful cartoon videogame treat for the whole family.

Video Games magazine said that "it's not a total disaster, but in light of the other child-oriented games recently released by Atari, especially Pigs in Space and Snoopy and the Red Baron, it is a disappointment".
TV Gamer said that "not the most difficult game ever created but then it is designed for younger gamers. The graphics are pretty good and overall the game is to be recommended to young gamers and Walt Disney fans".

The Vid Kid's Book of Home Video Games gave the game an overall rating of B.

Reviews
TeleMatch - Jul, 1983
Tilt - Sep, 1983

References

External links
Preview in L'Atarien
Article in Maniac
Review in L'Atarien

1983 video games
Atari 2600 games
Atari 2600-only games
Atari games
Disney video games
Fantasia (franchise)
Mickey Mouse video games
Single-player video games
Video games based on films
Works based on The Sorcerer's Apprentice